is a 1993 scrolling shooter video game developed by Aprinet and published by Soft Vision International for the Sega Mega Drive. The game was released in Japan on June 25, 1993 and in South Korea in 1993. Eliminate Down gives players immediate access to three directional-based weapons that could all be powered up as they fought strange alien enemies through eight enormous levels.

Gameplay 

Reminiscent of Hellfire, the Steel Pyron has three firing directional weapons all ready at the player's disposal: a forward firing blaster, a rear laser attack and diagonal, four-way firing bombs. The forward firing attack also has the Super Crash Shot, a small white straight-firing rocket, that with upgrades changes into a long white laser beam that can fire through foreground objects. Unlike Hellfire however, the game has no checkpoint system, though the game makes players restart a level once they lose all of their lives. Extends are set at every 100,000 points.

The weapons are upgradeable by collecting Power-Up icons; obtaining a certain number of Power-Ups level-ups the size and strength of the player's weapons, but the weapons are upgradable to just three different levels. The only other defenses the players has is a shield pick-up called the Barrier that protects the ship for at least two hits. The A and C buttons allow the player to switch among the three weapons. Players can also change the speed of the ship by pausing the game and adjusting the speed level on the pause screen.

Eliminate Down also has a mini-game playable at the main menu similar to Concentration where players have to find the right image under a certain time limit.

Plot 
Mankind has begun its space pioneering era as the 30th century is about to begin. However, an alien race known as the Amuleto appears out of a space distortion and travels toward the Earth. Its intentions prove hostile as human investigations are destroyed and the Amuleto space fleet grows. Mankind's best chance against the invaders is the Steel Pyron, a space fighter designed for multiple combat situations and warp drive jumping.

Development and release

Reception 

Eliminate Down received mixed reception from critics.

Notes

References

External links 
 Eliminate Down at GameFAQs
 Eliminate Down at Giant Bomb
 Eliminate Down at MobyGames

1993 video games
Scrolling shooters
Sega Genesis games
Sega Genesis-only games
Science fiction video games
Side-scrolling video games
Video games developed in Japan
Single-player video games
Video games set in the 30th century